Conspiracy 58 is a Swedish mockumentary from 2002, produced by Sveriges Television, the Swedish public broadcaster. The film examines the fictional KSP58 movement, that claims that the 1958 FIFA World Cup in Sweden did not really take place, but was faked and exists only as forged television and radio coverage in a conspiracy between American and Swedish television, the CIA and FIFA as part of the Cold War. In the film, it is said that Sweden did not have the economic or technical resources to actually host such a large event. In the plot, the American motive for doing this was to test the effectiveness of televised propaganda. When the film originally aired, the audience was not told in advance that it was a mockumentary, giving the impression that Conspiracy 58 was a regular documentary film.

Plot 
A large amount of "evidence" is presented. For example, there is analysis of television recordings of the matches, where houses can be seen in the background that never actually stood there. The film also analyzes how the shadows of the players in the field were falling, and were angled in a way that is not possible in Sweden given the position of the sun at the time. The Chairman of KSP58, Bror Jacques de Wærn, who was employed by the Swedish National Agency for more than twenty years, states that he has looked for evidence that the tournament really took place, but didn't find anything. After the end of the film it was revealed that the film was a mockumentary.

The aim of the film, according to the director Johan Löfstedt, was to illustrate how historical revisionism (in particular Holocaust denial) works and to highlight the importance of source criticism when getting information from, for example, the media.

The majority of the characters in the film are real celebrities who were playing themselves.

Cast

Notes

External links 
Official website 

2002 television films
2002 films
1958 FIFA World Cup
Films about conspiracy theories
Cold War films
2000s mockumentary films
2000s Swedish-language films
Swedish short films
2002 in Swedish television
Hoaxes in Sweden